Arlette Sterckx (born 1964) is a Belgian television actress.

Although she has appeared in a number of television series since 1995 such as Editie and in two episodes of Flikken she is best known for her portrayal of Lies Weemaes in the Belgium Dutch language action drama TV series Spoed in which she acted as one of the lead characters in 204 episodes between the year 2000 and 2007. On Spoed she worked with acclaimed Belgian actor Leo Madder.

See also
Spoed

External links
 

Flemish television actresses
1964 births
Living people
20th-century Flemish actresses
21st-century Flemish actresses
Place of birth missing (living people)